Fiona Ramage (born 12 July 1978) is a New Zealand cyclist. She competed at the 2000 Summer Olympics in Sydney, in the women's sprint where she came in 10th, and the women's track time trial where she came in 16th.

References

External links

1978 births
Living people
New Zealand female cyclists
Olympic cyclists of New Zealand
Cyclists at the 2000 Summer Olympics